BT Sport is a group of pay television sports channels in the United Kingdom and Ireland. Owned by Warner Bros. Discovery Sports Europe and BT Group, they first launched on 1 August 2013. The channels are based at the former International Broadcast Centre at the Queen Elizabeth Olympic Park in London. BT Sport is available on the BT TV, Sky and Virgin Media television platforms in the UK and Sky, Eir TV and Vodafone TV in the Republic of Ireland.

The networks were established in 2013 after BT Group's acquisition of rights to the Premier League. BT also acquired the operations of previous rightsholder ESPN prior to launch, integrating them with BT Sport. In 2022, BT Group announced an agreement with Warner Bros. Discovery to form a joint venture that would merge BT Sport with its local Eurosport business. The transaction was approved in July 2022; in February 2023, it was announced that BT Sport would rebrand as TNT Sports later in the year, with Eurosport UK to be folded into the brand no later than early-2026.

History

Premier League deal, launch 
News of BT's first foray into sports broadcasting first came about on 12 June 2012, when it was announced that they had won the rights to 38 live Premier League matches for three seasons from the 2013-14 season, beating ESPN UK, which had held the shared rights with Sky Sports the previous season. BT announced at the same time that it would be launching its own channel for its new football coverage.  The news followed speculation that ESPN was reconsidering its position in the UK. The following months also saw BT win rights to Premiership Rugby and its associated 7s Series, and American, Brazilian, French and Italian top-flight football.

On 25 February 2013,  BT announced an agreement to acquire ESPN's television networks in the UK and Ireland, including ESPN and international sports channel ESPN America; this agreement gave BT rights to the FA Cup beginning in 2013–14, the Bundesliga and UEFA Europa League through 2015, and the Scottish Premier League through 2017, as well as other international event rights licensed through ESPN. The value of the deal was not disclosed, but BT was understood to be paying "low tens of millions". The deal was expected to close by 31 July, and BT was expected to operate at least one ESPN-branded channel as part of the BT Sport service.

BT made other notable rights deals ahead of BT Sport's launch, including UFC mixed martial arts under a three-year deal, and MotoGP beginning in 2014, under a five-year deal. In May 2013, BT announced that BT Sport would be offered for free to its internet subscribers via streaming. Media analyst Steve Hewlett felt that BT's entry into the sport market was an effort to help strengthen its triple play business and, in particular, help retain internet subscribers lost to Sky (which he believed would result in greater financial loss than those that would be sustained by operating BT Sport).

BT Sport launched on 1 August 2013. On 12 August, BT reported that over 1,000,000 households had subscribed to the service ahead of the start of the 2013–14 Premier League, although admitting that the majority of them were BT internet subscribers.

On 9 November 2013, BT Sport announced its acquisition of rights to the UEFA Champions League and Europa League beginning in 2015–16, under a three-year deal valued at £897 million, replacing Sky and ITV. The interactive service BT Sport Extra launched in 2014. In January 2015, BT Sport renewed its licensing agreement with ESPN International under a seven-year deal, allowing it to continue operating an ESPN-branded network as part of BT Sport, and hold rights to ESPN original programming, and event broadcast rights that are distributed internationally by ESPN.

UEFA deal, expansion 
On 9 June 2015, BT Sport announced it would launch a new channel, BT Sport Europe, which would carry all UEFA Champions League and Europa League matches. Concurrently it was announced that only the BT Sport 1 channel would be free to BT internet subscribers, and that BT Sport 2, BT Sport ESPN, and BT Sport Europe would require viewers to subscribe for £5 extra. BT also announced a Freeview HD channel, BT Sport Showcase, which would carry 12 Champions League matches and 14 Europa League matches per season on a free-to-air basis, including at least one match per-round, each English team featured once, and the finals of both tournaments.

BT Sport also announced that it would launch BT Sport Ultra HD, the first 4K sports channel in the UK, on 2 August for the 2015 FA Community Shield. The channel would initially be exclusive to BT TV on BT Infinity, with a 4K service package and compatible YouView set-top box. In 2016, BT Sport Europe was renamed BT Sport 3.

In 2017, BT Sport began an agreement with boxing promoter Frank Warren, under which Warren's channel BoxNation would be distributed as part of the BT Sport service, and that BT Sport and BoxNation would co-produce 20 cards per-year, which would air on Saturday nights and be simulcast by both networks. In April 2018, BT Sport announced a pay-per-view service, BT Sport Box Office, with an intent to broadcast premium boxing events. On 2 August 2019, BT Sport relaunched its 4K channel as BT Sport Ultimate, and began to offer Dolby Atmos sound and high dynamic range (HDR) on supported devices.

On 20 June 2019, BT Sport announced an agreement to carry the programming and pay-per-views of U.S. professional wrestling promotion WWE, ending a relationship with Sky Sports that dated back to the network's launch in 1989.

Joint venture with Warner Bros. Discovery, TNT Sports 
In April 2021, it was reported that BT were exploring a sale of all or part of BT Sport, in order to focus more on its fibreoptic services. Rumoured suitors included Amazon.com Inc. (which is one of the Premier League's current rightsholders), the sports streaming provider DAZN (which had notably beat out Sky Italia for exclusive domestic rights to Serie A football), and ESPN owner Disney. By September 2021, DAZN were reported to be in "advanced talks" with BT. However, in December, it was reported that negotiations had stalled, and that Discovery Inc.—who owns competitor Eurosport, and were preparing to merge with WarnerMedia to form Warner Bros. Discovery (WBD)—was negotiating a joint venture with BT to combine their respective networks. In February 2022, the two companies entered exclusive negotiations.

On 11 May 2022 Warner Bros. Discovery EMEA announced that it had reached an agreement to combine its Eurosport UK business with BT Sport in a 50/50 joint venture, in a transaction scheduled to be completed by the end of 2022 pending approval from regulators and sports bodies. Under the agreement, WBD will assume the operations of BT Sport, and merge them with Eurosport under a new brand at a later date. WBD will pay £93 million to BT over three years; if performance targets are met, WBD will pay a bonus of up to £540 million. The company will also have the option to buy out more of BT's stake in the venture. As part of the agreement, BT agreed to distribute Warner Bros. Discovery's factual streaming service Discovery+—which is the streaming platform of Eurosport—at no charge to most BT TV subscribers, and those who subscribe to BT Sport via the company directly.

The venture was approved by the Competition and Markets Authority (CMA) on 22 July 2022, and the merger was completed on 1 September. On 1 August 2022, BT Sport ESPN was rebranded as BT Sport 4, while the BT Sport Extra overflow channels were rebranded as BT Sport 5 through 10. 

On 21 February 2023, it was announced that BT Sport would rebrand as TNT Sports in July 2023, ahead of the 2023–24 football season; the branding is derived from WBD's U.S. television channel TNT (which has historically carried sports coverage such as the NBA), and has also been used by WarnerMedia sports networks in Latin America. The Eurosport UK channels will be folded into TNT Sports at a later date, expected to be no sooner than the 2024 Summer Olympics, but no later than the 2026 Winter Olympics.

Availability 
In the UK, BT Sport is available in standard definition with all BT TV packages for BT Broadband customers. The 4K channel BT Sport Ultimate is also available to BT Superfast Fibre customers for an additional fee. BT Sport operates six part-time overflow channels, originally branded as BT Sport Extra, but branded since August 2022 as BT Sport 5–10. They are carried via the red button on Sky, and displayed as individual channels on the BT and Virgin Media EPGs.

On Sky BT Sport 1 only is currently offered for free to broadband subscribers as 'BT Sport Lite', regardless of what subscription they have. Plusnet TV also offered the same until 1 November 2021 when their TV brand was discontinued, however BT Sport is still available to Plusnet customers via the app service. Customers who wish to view the remaining channels can subscribe to the 'BT Sport Pack' in either standard or high definition. BT also provide broadband subscribers access to the channels via the BT Sport online player and mobile app.

Virgin Media customers receive BT Sport 1, 2, 3, 4, and Ultimate as part of their "Full House" bundle however, they do not receive BoxNation or AMC from BT.

TalkTalk TV customers must subscribe to the BT Sport Pack in order to receive the entire range of channels.

In the Republic of Ireland, BT Sport channels (except Ultimate) are bundled with Eir Sport subscriptions across all platforms, as a part of a deal BT had with its predecessor Setanta Sports

In addition Freeview HD customers received BT Sport Showcase and Virgin Media customers received BT Sport Free. They closed on 30 June 2018.

On 4 December 2018, the SD versions of BT Sport and BT Sport ESPN stopped broadcasting on Virgin Media.

On 6 February 2019, BT Sport released the app for Xbox One. It was later released for PlayStation 4 on 31 May 2019. On 8 September, 2020 BT Sport also launched on Fire TV, Android TV and the Roku devices.

Programming

Plans for the channels launch came about when it was announced in June 2012 that the broadcast rights to the Premier League from the 2013–14 to 2015–16 seasons were awarded to BT and Sky, outbidding existing broadcaster ESPN for the rights. BT showed 38 live matches from the Premier League each season, including 18 first pick matches, from the 2013/14 season til the end of the 2015/16 season.

In October 2012, BT announced it had also agreed deals to air Serie A, Ligue 1, Brasileirão and Major League Soccer, all of which were previously broadcast on ESPN, as well as Premiership Rugby.

In January 2013, BT announced they would also broadcast Women's Tennis Association matches from 21 tournaments.

On 25 February 2013, BT announced that it had acquired ESPN's UK channels and their sports broadcasting rights, including rights to the FA Cup, UEFA Europa League, Scottish Premier League, Bundesliga and NASCAR. This led to the shutting down of ESPN Classic and ESPN America in favour of the BT Sport channels.

On 7 May 2013, BT Sport acquired the rights to air Ultimate Fighting Championship (UFC) events and taped programming in the UK and Ireland for three years, from 1 August. Two days later it was announced that BT Sport had acquired an exclusive five-year deal to broadcast MotoGP races from the 2014 season, including free practices and qualifying as well as full coverage of Moto2 and Moto3. BT Sport also broadcasts the FA WSL, A-League and programming from Red Bull Media House.

On 9 May 2013, BT announced that they had acquired the exclusive UK TV rights to MotoGP along with the Moto2 and Moto3 championships. Later in May, BT Sport acquired rights to the Football Conference for two years with 25-30 live games a season, including the end-of-season play-offs.

In January 2014, it was reported that BT Sport had acquired the rights to broadcast the World Rally Championship for the 2014 season.

Football coverage
BT Sport has carried the Premier League since its launch; as of the 2020–21 season, BT Sport holds rights to around 52 live matches per-season, including 32 Saturday matches with 12:30 p.m. kickoffs, and 20 midweek fixtures scheduled around the winter break in January and February.

On 9 November 2013, BT announced a £897 million deal with UEFA to broadcast the Champions League and Europa League exclusively on BT Sport from the 2015–16 season for three years. The deal ended two decades of the competition being broadcast free-to-air on ITV, although BT stated that the finals of both competitions and at least one match per season involving each participating British team would still be broadcast free-to-air (doing so via the BT Sport Showcase channel).

For the 2016–17 season, BT Sport premiered the studio programme BT Sport Score, which airs on Saturday matchdays and competes primarily with Sky's Soccer Saturday.

BT Sport has held rights to the National League since 2013, which were most recently renewed in 2020; BT Sport carries a weekly match on Saturdays, and the weekly National League highlights show. It has also carried the FA Trophy and FA Vase matches.

It has also carried France's Ligue 1 since 2013, and Italy's Serie A (which most recently returned to the network in 2021).

Rugby union coverage

Premiership Rugby
BT became a senior broadcast partner of Premiership Rugby in 2013–14. The original Premiership coverage deal ran until the 2016–17 season and allowed BT Sport to exclusively broadcast up to 69 live games per season. The Aviva Premiership's viewing figures rose by 40% in TV audiences in its first season with BT Sport. A third deal was signed in December 2020 to cover Premiership Rugby and the Premiership Rugby Cup until 2024. The deal covers up to 80 matches a season from 2016–17 and introduced an extended highlights programme from the 2015–16 season. Subsequently, in 2017 Channel 5 announced a deal that would see them simulcast five matches per season until the end of the 2020–21 season. ITV subsequently took over the simulcasting rights, broadcasting up to 6 league season matches and the final between the 2021–22 and 2023–24 seasons. 

The deal with BT Sport also sees them exclusively broadcast the league's associated sevens series and the Premiership Rugby Cup. BT Sport also had exclusive live rights to the Anglo-Welsh Cup from 2016–17 until its final competition in 2017–18.

European Professional Club Rugby
BT originally shared rights to European Professional Club Rugby (EPCR)'s champions and challenge cups with Sky Sports. The shared nature of the deal meant each broadcaster would exclusively broadcast up to 30 pool matches, 2 quarter-finals and 1 semi-final from each competition with the finals being shown by both. BT also received first pick on Champions Cup matches involving Premiership Rugby clubs.

For seven seasons from the 2018–19 season, BT Sport became the official broadcast partner of the Champions and Challenge cups and broadcast up to 134 matches per season. The Challenge Cup will be shown exclusively on BT Sport whilst broadcasting of the Champions Cup was shared with Channel 4 in the UK and Virgin Media Sport in the Republic of Ireland until 2022 and with ITV and RTÉ from 2022 to 2024. Both channels simulcast one match from each round and the final.

Cricket coverage 
In August 2015, BT Sport acquired rights to Cricket Australia under a five-year deal starting in the 2016–17 season; the package included rights to internationals hosted by Australia (including English tours of Australia such as the 2017–18 Ashes series), as well as rights to the domestic Big Bash League. BT Sport renewed its rights in the 2021–22 season, holding rights to Australian internationals through the 2025 season (including the 2021–22 Ashes series); the rights to the BBL and Women's Big Bash League were sold separately to Sky Sports. In February 2021, BT also reached deals for New Zealand and West Indies home matches.

Motorsport coverage 
BT Sport has rights to numerous British, European, American and global motorsport series both in live and highlights form.

MotoGP

MotoGP is BT Sport's flagship motorsports event and in addition to the main MotoGP event, BT shows the Moto2, Moto3, Red Bull Rookies and CEV Repsol championships. Suzi Perry hosts the coverage alongside pundits Colin Edwards, Sylvain Guintoli, Michael Laverty and Neil Hodgson. Commentary is provided by Gavin Emmett and Hodgson, with Charlie Hiscott joined for Friday sessions coverage. Natalie Quirk appears as reporter. Emmett also presents Chequered Flag which is aired after the MotoGP race has finished.

Motorcycle Speedway

BT Sport also broadcasts motorcycle speedway including, the Premiership Speedway, Speedway Grand Prix and the Speedway of Nations. Natalie Quirk and Scott Nicholls host the coverage. The commentary team is Nigel Pearson and Kelvin Tatum with Steve Brandon, the reporter.

Other International Motorsport Events

Other live series include the World Rally Championship, FIA World Endurance Championship, FIA European Formula Three Championship, International GT Open, World Series by Renault, Deutsche Tourenwagen Masters, and the Australian Supercars Championship where the world feed is taken directly from the host broadcaster. Highlights packages are also shown on BT Sport for series such as BRDC Formula 4 Championship and the British Formula Three Championship.

American sports coverage
BT Sport shows extensive coverage of American sports, including Major League Baseball (MLB), American College sports (NCAA football and NCAA basketball), Major League Lacrosse (MLL), and the X Games. BT Sport has a long-term agreement with ESPN to carry its original programming (including original documentaries and studio programmes), and events whose international rights are owned by ESPN International.

Combat sports coverage

Mixed martial arts
BT Sport holds the UK rights to UFC programming, most recently renewed in 2018, including live events and other non-live programming. They also broadcast Cage Warriors events  on occasions.

Since UFC 239, selected UFC pay-per-view events have now been carried exclusively on BT Sport Box Office, and are no longer included at no additional charge—a move which faced criticism from domestic fans.

BT Sports first ever live event was August 3, 2013 of which was UFC 163 headlined by José Aldo and The Korean Zombie.

BT Sport have been highly praised by the UFC and fans alike for their coverage and work on their promo's. They have also created their own original programming to go alongside this such as Dan Hardy's Breakdown Show, preview and post fight shows and even hosting their own awards show with Nick Peet, Adam Catterall and UFC Hall of Famer Michael Bisping.

BT Sport will often air UFC produced shows during their programming such as UFC Now, Connected, Main Event, Greatest Fights, Countdown and more.

BT Sport is looking to renew the UFC rights until 2025.

Boxing
Since 2017 BT Sport has an association with BoxNation to show certain live fights from Frank Warren Promotions. On 15 September 2018 BT Sport showed its first boxing pay-per-view boxing event - the rematch between Gennady Golovkin and Saul Alvarez and on 1 December 2018 BT showed the Deontay Wilder vs. Tyson Fury fight. Both were shown on BT's pay-per-view channel BT Sport Box Office. Paul Dempsey leads the coverage alongside Richie Woodhall, Steve Bunce and other guests. John Rawling and Barry Jones provide commentary with Caroline Pearce or Ronald McIntosh the ringside reporters.

Professional wrestling 
On June 20, 2019, U.S. professional wrestling promotion WWE announced that its programming would move to BT Sport in the beginning of 2020 (with pay-per-view programs sold via BT Sport Box Office), ending a relationship with Sky Sports that dated back to the network's launch in 1989. As well as live shows, BT Sport also shows repeated highlights of Raw, SmackDown, NXT, NXT UK and pay-per-views. In addition, they show certain WWE Network programs, such as WWE Ruthless Aggression and WWE 24, as well as special editions of No Filter WWE.

Due to COVID-19 restrictions, WWE were unable to film their NXT UK shows under typical circumstances. To resolve this, BT let WWE utilize a set at the BT London Studios. NXT UK recommenced tapings on September 17, 2020.

World Poker Tour 
In February, the World Poker Tour (WPT) announced a new deal with BT Sports to broadcast the World Poker Tour in the UK and Ireland across BT Sports networks. The company will broadcast season XV of the WPT, which took place from 2016–2017. Highlights from the season include the first WPT victory of poker commentator Mike Sexton and the first victory by a woman in an open WPT event.

Previous coverage

Football

FA Cup
BT Sport obtained the rights to the FA Cup through its acquisition of ESPN, who had one year remaining in their existing contract. In 2016, BT Group extended its contract with The Football Association to show up to 30 live games a season from the competition from 2018–19 to 2020–21.

In the first and second rounds, Matt Smith, Reshmin Chowdhury, Lynsey Hipgrave or Darrell Currie hosted the coverage. Lead commentary on these games was provided by Adam Summerton, Ian Darke and Paul Dempsey, alongside co-commentators, Adam Virgo and Kevin Davies. Reporters on these games included, Andy May, Natalie Quirk, Jeff Brazier and Becky Ives.

From the third round onwards, Jake Humphrey, Lynsey Hipgrave, Darrell Currie or Matt Smith hosted, alongside pundits taken from the Premier League coverage. Lead commentators included, Darke, Dempsey and Summerton as well as, Darren Fletcher and Peter Drury, and co-commentators included, Steve McManaman, Robbie Savage, Glenn Hoddle, Martin Keown and Jermaine Jenas. Reporters included, Des Kelly, Reshmin Chowdhury and Andy May.

The 2021 FA Cup Final was the last FA Cup game covered on BT Sport, with ITV regaining the rights from the 2021–22 season onwards.

FA Community Shield
From 2015 to 2020, BT Sport held exclusive live coverage of the FA Community Shield. From 2021, these rights transferred to ITV.

Scottish Professional Football League
BT hosted rights to show 30 Scottish Professional Football League games a season, sharing the rights with Sky Sports and BBC Alba. Darrell Currie was the main presenter with pundits including Chris Sutton, Stephen Craigan, Ally McCoist, Michael Stewart and Alex Rae. All of these pundits also contributed to co-commentary duty alongside Derek Rae, Rory Hamilton, or Rob MacLean who were the lead commentators. There was always a 3-man commentary line up on the Scottish coverage with the most prominent co-commentary pairing being Craigan and Sutton. Emma Dodds and Connie McLaughlin were the match reporters on the coverage. From the 2016/17 season, BT Sport had aired a 30-minute preview show "Scottish Football Extra" before every live match. From the 2020–21 season, all 48 live SPFL Premiership matches will be on Sky Sports.

Scottish League Cup
From the start of the 2016–17 season, BT Sport had been the home of exclusive live coverage of the Scottish League Cup, showing two or three live matches per round, from July through to the final in November. The same personnel used on the SPFL coverage was used on Scottish League Cup coverage. From 2020, Premier Sports, will take over the rights for the Scottish League Cup showing 12 to 16 games per season.

Bundesliga
BT Sport had full exclusive rights to the Bundesliga and 2. Bundesliga. Lead commentary on Bundesliga action comes from Ben Andrews, Steve Bower, Simon Brotherton, Paul Dempsey, Dave Farrar, James Fielden, Seb Hutchinson, Alistair Mann, Dan Mason, Jonathan Pearce, John Roder, Dan Roebuck, Mark Scott, Joe Speight, Adam Summerton, Paul Walker, Oliver Wilson and Steven Wyeth. The co-commentators include Jim Beglin, Tony Dorigo, Efan Ekoku, Kevin Gallacher, Don Hutchison, Chris Perry, Stewart Robson and Nigel Spackman. Occasionally, Premier League pundit and ex Bayern Munich player, Owen Hargreaves also contributes to co-commentary. Ben Andrews, Tim Caple, James Fielden, Mark Scott and Oliver Wilson are the lead commentators on 2. Bundesliga coverage. BT Sport lost rights to the Bundesliga from the 2021-22 season onwards for the next 4 years to Sky Sports.

DFB Pokal 
BT Sport previously broadcast DFB-Pokal. From the start of the 2018–19 season, coverage moved to Eleven Sports for a season only,.

CONMEBOL Libertadores 
Previously, BT Sport showed both 2018 Copa Libertadores Finals between the Argentine Superclásico rivals Boca Juniors and River Plate; in simulcast with FreeSports. A year later, the Copa Libertadores final coverage moved to BBC Two.

Süper Lig 
Towards the end of the 2019–20 season, BT Sport began showing 3 games a week from the Turkish Süper Lig.

Cricket

Caribbean Premier League
BT have broadcast all 34 matches from the Caribbean Premier League most recently in 2017. Sky Sports took over the rights from the 2018 edition onwards.

Indian Premier League
In 2019, BT Sport also won rights off Sky Sports to broadcast every match of the 2019 Indian Premier League, however from the 2020 Indian Premier League the rights switched back to Sky Sports.

Tennis
In January 2013, BT Sport signed a deal with the WTA to show 21 live tournaments from the women's tennis tour. The coverage consisted of up to 800 live hours of coverage every year until 2016, each season ending with the WTA Finals.

From January 2017, BT Sport had the rights to show 52 WTA tournaments every year until 2019. Coverage on most competitions took feeds from the WTA international TV feed, but with larger events from the Premier Mandatory and Premier 5 category matches, Sam Smith or occasionally Annabel Croft presented coverage alongside Martina Navratilova. Lead commentary was provided by Chris Bradnam, David Law and David Mercer alongside co-commentators, Annabel Croft, Nigel Sears, Anne Keothavong and Jo Durie.

The last competition BT Sport broadcast was the 2019 WTA Finals in which Clare Balding presented coverage alongside Anne Keothavong and Jo Durie. With Annabel Croft and Nigel Sears reporting from Shenzhen. Lead commentary came from David Law and David Mercer alongside Keothavong and
Durie.

For the 2020 WTA Tour onwards, Amazon Prime Video are now the exclusive UK broadcaster, showing 49 tournaments a year.

Darts

BDO Darts coverage
It was announced in December 2014 that BT Sport would share the rights to the 2015 BDO World Darts Championship alongside BBC Sport. Coverage would be presented by Ray Stubbs for the first two years of their coverage. In August 2016 they signed a new 2-year deal to share rights this time with Channel 4. Matt Smith took over as presenter with Chris Mason as studio pundit and Reshmin Chowdhury as roving reporter. Commentators on BT Sport Darts coverage were John Rawling, Jim Proudfoot, Vassos Alexander, Paul Nicholson, Deta Hedman and Chris Mason, these are shared with Channel 4's coverage, as the commentary is produced independently. BT Sport did not renew their contract for the 2019 tournament and the rights are now held by QUEST and Eurosport

Basketball

NBA 
BT Sport previously held exclusive rights to the NBA, since 2009–10 season. Live coverage of the games began on ESPN, from 6 October 2009 when the Utah Jazz took on the pre-season game against Chicago Bulls as part of NBA Europe Live Tour. Coverage continued on 8 October 2009 for Utah Jazz against Euroleague Basketball's Real Madrid Baloncesto. The NBA season officially started on 27 October 2009.

ESPN UK was unable to secure the rights to the 2012-13 NBA season until 5 December 2012 when a deal was made between NBA and ESPN to show 3 games a week, NBA All Star Game, First and Second Round NBA Play-off coverage, Western Conference Finals, and NBA Finals for this season (2012–13). Coverage began the following day. The channel continues to show this after the acquisition of ESPN by BT Sport (becomes BT Sport ESPN) until 2017–18 season. From 2018–19 season, coverage moved to Sky Sports.

WNBA 
Same as the men's league games, the Women's NBA games also moved to Sky Sports from 2018–19 season.

Magazine shows
 Rugby Tonight - Sundays at 17:15 pm sees Martin Bayfield, Ugo Monye and Lawrence Dallaglio present a debate about rugby union. Their guests include current and former players and referees reviewing and previewing the Aviva Premiership and France's Top 14.
 UFC: Beyond The Octagon - Presented by Adam Catterall alongside Gareth A Davies and Dan Hardy
 Boxing Tonight - Presented by Paul Dempsey
 BT Sport Score - Saturdays at 3:00 pm, keeps up with the latest scores across the UK presented by Darrell Currie and Jules Breach who are joined by various pundits.
 UEFA Champions League Magazine - Fridays at 7:00 pm.
 ESPN FC - Sunday-Saturday at 11:30 pm sees Dan Thomas present a football debate show alongside a list of pundits and writers including Craig Burley, Stewart Robson, Steve McManaman, Steve Nicol, and Don Hutchison.

Documentaries
BT Sport produces a series of feature-length sports documentary films under the title BT Sport Films. Among the films shown on the channel are The Beautiful Game, I Believe in Miracles and Don't Take Me Home. Documentaries that have been critically well-received include Rocky & Wrighty: From Brockley To The Big Time, about childhood friends David Rocastle and Ian Wright, Shoulder To Shoulder, on the Ireland national rugby union team during The Troubles, and Brothers in Football, which tells the story of Corinthian Football Club.

These are shown alongside documentaries from ESPN, including 30 for 30, Nine for IX, SEC Storied and Backstory, as well as official MotoGP films.

Classic sport
BT Sport's weekday daytime schedules often include sporting action from yesteryear. Football features heavily and includes league matches from the 1970s and 1980s from both the ITV Sport, including full editions of The Big Match, and the BBC's Match of the Day archives. Also featured are FA Cup matches from the 1970s to the present day and UEFA Champions League matches. Other sporting action includes boxing matches from the ESPN and ITV Sport archives as well as MotoGP races and Australian cricket.

See also
BT Sport 4
BT Sport Box Office

References

External links
 

BT Sport
Joint ventures
Sports television in the United Kingdom
Sports television channels in the United Kingdom
Television channels and stations established in 2013
Warner Bros. Discovery